HMS Hardy was a  which served with the Royal Navy.  She was built by William Doxford & Sons in 1895, launched on 16 December 1895, and sold off on 11 July 1911.

Construction and design
HMS Hardy was one of the two destroyers ordered from William Doxford & Sons on 3 November 1893 as part of the Royal Navy's 1893–1894 construction programme.

As a torpedo boat, the planned armament was a single QF 12 pounder 12 cwt ( calibre) gun on a platform on the ship's conning tower (in practice the platform was also used as the ship's bridge), together with a secondary gun armament of three 6-pounder guns, and two 18 inch (450 mm) torpedo tubes. As a gunboat, one of the torpedo tubes could be removed to accommodate a further two six-pounders.

Three funnels were fitted. The ship's complement was 50 officers and men.

She was laid down as Yard Number 226 at Doxford's Sunderland shipyard on 4 June 1894, and was launched on 16 December 1895.

Service history

She saw early service in home waters. In 1896 Hardy was in reserve at Chatham. In 1901 she was with the Mediterranean Squadron, but was relieved by the destroyer  in late May the following year. She arrived at Plymouth on 5 July 1902, and paid off at Chatham later the same month. Lieutenant Robert Gordon Douglas Dewar was appointed in command during summer 1902, and was briefly succeeded by Lieutenant George Geoffrey Codrington from  late 1902 until January 1903, when she took the place of HMS Angler in the Medway instructional flotilla.

Hardy was sold for scrap at Devonport for £1400 on 11 July 1911.

Notes

Bibliography
 

 
 

Hardy-class destroyers
Ships built on the River Wear
1895 ships
A-class destroyers (1913)